Kashi Vishwanath is an 2019 Indian, Bhojpuri language action, romance and drama film directed by Subbarao Gosangi and produced by Sarveshwar Reddy (S.S. Reddy) under the banner of "Gangotri Studios Private Limited". It stars Ritesh Pandey and Kajal Raghwani in lead roles while Sarika Thosar, Nisha Dubey, Sanjay Verma, Sakila Majid, Uday Shrivastav, Dharmendra Dharam,  Supriya, Mohan Shetty, Ratan Nihtha, Ajay Yadav, Narendra Sharma and others play supporting roles.

Cast
Ritesh Pandey
Kajal Raghwani
Sarika Thosar
Nisha Dubey
Sanjay Verma
Sakila Majid
Uday Shrivastav
Dharmendra Dharam
Supriya
Mohan Shetty
Ratan Nihtha
Ajay Yadav
Narendra Sharma

Music
The music of "Kashi Vishwanath" is composed by Om Jha with lyrics penned by Shyam Dehati, Arvind Tiwari and Yadav Raj. It is produced under the "Yashi Films".

First song of this film "Chhamak Challo" was released on 29 March 2019 at YouTube official handel of "Yashi Films". It trended on YouTube.

Marketing
First-look romantic poster of this film was released on 7 February 2019

Trailer of this film was released on 3 May 2019 at official YouTube channel of "Yashi Films", who also bought his digital satellite rights. Trailer has cross over 4.1 million views on YouTube till now.

References

2019 films

2010s Bhojpuri-language films